Eriauchenus workmani is a species in the family Archaeidae. It is the type species of the genus Eriauchenus. It was first described by Octavius Pickard-Cambridge. It is endemic to Madagascar. The genus name has also been incorrectly spelt "Eriauchenius".

References 

Archaeidae
Spiders described in 1881